Song Lingsheng (born 1915, date of death unknown) was a Chinese footballer. He competed in the men's tournament at the 1948 Summer Olympics.

References

External links
 
 

1915 births
Year of death missing
Chinese footballers
China international footballers
Olympic footballers of China
Footballers at the 1948 Summer Olympics
Place of birth missing
Association football midfielders
Sing Tao SC players